Anstruther Davidson (1860–1932) was a Scottish-American physician, professor of medicine, botanist, and entomologist.

Biography
Born in Scotland, Davidson attended the University of Glasgow, where he graduated CM MB in 1881 and received his higher MD in 1887. He served a medical internship in the Glasgow Western Infirmary and then went into private practice at Thornhill, Dumfriesshire. After some time spent in Vienna, he emigrated in 1889 to the United States. He practiced medicine in Los Angeles and published papers in medical journals. He became an associate professor of dermatology at the University of Southern California, while simultaneously studying natural history and publishing papers on botany and entomology.

In 1897 he married Alice Jane Merritt (1859–1931), author of California Plants in Their Homes: A Botanical Reader for Children (1898).

Anstruther Davidson died at Good Samaritan Hospital in Los Angeles on April 3, 1932.

Selected publications
 
 
 with George L. Moxley:

Eponyms
 Acmispon decumbens var. davidsonii (Greene) Govaerts
 Malvastrum davidsonii B.L.Rob.

References

Botanists with author abbreviations
1860 births
1932 deaths
19th-century American botanists
20th-century American botanists
Alumni of the University of Glasgow
Keck School of Medicine of USC faculty